Ángel Oscar Brunell Sosa (born February 2, 1945 in Tacuarembó, Uruguay) is a Uruguayan former footballer who played as a defender for clubs in Uruguay, Brazil and Chile.

Teams (Player)
 Danubio 1964–1968
 Nacional 1968–1972
 Fluminense 1973–1975
 Everton 1976
 Colo-Colo 1977–1979
 Rentistas 1980

Teams (Head coach)
 Rentistas
 Tacuarembó

Honours
Nacional
 Uruguayan Primera División: 1969, 1970, 1971 and 1972
 Copa Libertadores
 Intercontinental Cup: 1971
 Interamericana Cup: 1972

Everton
 Chilean Primera División: 1976

Colo-Colo
 Chilean Primera División: 1979

References

External links
 

1945 births
Living people
People from Tacuarembó
Uruguayan footballers
Association football defenders
Uruguay international footballers
Club Nacional de Football players
Danubio F.C. players
Colo-Colo footballers
Everton de Viña del Mar footballers
L.D.U. Quito managers
Uruguayan football managers
C.A. Rentistas managers
Uruguayan expatriate footballers
Uruguayan expatriate sportspeople in Chile
Expatriate footballers in Chile
Uruguayan expatriate sportspeople in Brazil
Expatriate footballers in Brazil
Danubio F.C. managers